Sir Clarence Johnston Graham, 1st Baronet (8 May 1900 – 22 December 1966) was a businessman and an Ulster Unionist Party politician in Northern Ireland.

Background

The son of John Graham JP and Sarah (nee Porter) Graham was educated at Banbridge Academy and the Queen's University, Belfast. He was director of his family's firm, John Graham (Dromore) Ltd, engineering contractors (est. c. 1788) from 1955. Graham Construction remains one of the largest construction firms in Northern Ireland and operates throughout the UK.

Politics

Graham was Chairman of the Standing Committee of the Ulster Unionist Council from 1947 to 1963. He was Chairman of Dromore Urban Council (1928–32) and of Iveagh Unionist Association (1935–65), and President of the latter from 1965 until his death.

Controversially, along with Brian Maginess, he called for the UUP to encourage Roman Catholic membership whilst speaking at a Young Unionists meeting in 1959.

Baronetcy

Having been knighted in 1952 he was, in 1964, created Baronet, of Dromore, County Down.  There were nine baronetcies created in 1964, no more were created until 1990, when Denis Thatcher was a recipient.  Sir Clarence was succeeded by his son, John Moodie Graham (born 3 April 1938), upon his death. Sir John Graham, the second baronet, lived in Fort Lauderdale, Florida, before returning to Northern Ireland

References

External links
GRAHAM company website  
 https://www.geni.com/projects/Graham-baronets/17666

1900 births
1966 deaths
Ulster Unionist Party councillors
Baronets in the Baronetage of the United Kingdom
Knights Bachelor
People educated at Banbridge Academy
Councillors in County Down